The Supreme Eurasian Economic Council is the highest supranational body of the Eurasian Economic Union.

In the Supreme Eurasian Economic Council composed of the Heads of State or Government of member states of the Eurasian Economic Union. Going on the level of heads of state at least once a year. Decisions are taken by consensus. The decisions are binding on all States parties. The Board determines the composition and powers of other regulatory agencies.

Members
Council members as of  :

Chronology

See also
Eurasian Economic Commission

References

Eurasian Economic Union